The Arden Shakespeare is a long-running series of scholarly editions of the works of William Shakespeare. It presents fully edited modern-spelling editions of the plays and poems, with lengthy introductions and full commentaries. There have been three distinct series of The Arden Shakespeare over the past century, with the third series commencing in 1995 and concluding in January 2020. Arden was the maiden name of Shakespeare's mother, Mary, but the primary reference of the enterprise's title is to the Forest of Arden, in which Shakespeare's As You Like It is set.

First Series
The first series was published by Methuen. Its first publication was Edward Dowden's edition of Hamlet, published in 1899. Over the next 25 years, the entire canon of Shakespeare was edited and published. The original editor of The Arden Shakespeare was William James Craig (1899–1906), succeeded by R. H. Case (1909–1944). The text of The Arden Shakespeare, First series, was based on the 1864 "Globe" or Cambridge edition of Shakespeare's Complete Works, edited by William George Clark and John Glover, as revised in 1891–93.

The list of the first series is as follows:

Second Series
The second series began in 1946, with a new group of editors freshly re-editing the plays, and was completed in the 1980s, though the Sonnets never appeared. It was published by Methuen in both hardback and paperback. Later issues of the paperbacks featured cover art by the Brotherhood of Ruralists. The second series was edited by Una Ellis-Fermor (1946–58); Harold F. Brooks (1952–82), Harold Jenkins (1958–82) and Brian Morris (1975–82). Unlike the first series, where each volume was based on the same textual source (The Globe Shakespeare), the individual editors of each volume of the second series were responsible for editing the text of the play in that edition.

Third Series
The third series of The Arden Shakespeare began to be edited during the 1980s, with publication starting in the 1995 and concluding in 2020. The batch of plays that launched the series was especially notable for the edition by Jonathan Bate of Titus Andronicus, which played a major role in rehabilitating the critical reputation of Shakespeare's earliest tragedy.

The first editions in this series were published by Routledge, before moving to Thomson. They then moved to Cengage Learning. In December 2008, the series returned to Methuen, becoming part of Methuen Drama, its original publisher. From February 2013, the titles appeared under the Bloomsbury imprint.

The editions in the third series were published very much in line with the traditions established by The Arden Shakespeare; however, editions in this series tended to be thicker than those of the first and second series, with more explanatory notes and much longer introductions. One unusual aspect of this series was its edition of Hamlet, which presents the play in two separate volumes. The first, released in 2006, contained an edited text of the Second Quarto (1604–05), with passages found only in the First Folio included in an appendix, while the supplementary second volume, released a year later, contained both the text of the First Quarto (sometimes called the "bad" quarto) of 1603, and of the First Folio of 1623. Other plays with "bad" quartos have them reproduced via photographs of each leaf of a surviving copy rather that deal with each textual anomaly on an individual basis.

The general editors for this series were Richard Proudfoot; Ann Thompson of King's College London; David Scott Kastan of Yale University; and H. R. Woudhuysen of the University of Oxford.

Editions
Editions that have been revised since first publication are marked with the year of revised publication in the 'Year' column.

Apocrypha
The third series is also notable for publishing single-volume editions of certain plays that traditionally form part of the so-called Shakespeare Apocrypha, but for which there is considered good evidence of Shakespeare having at least been co-author. Three apocryphal plays were published in this manner.
 Double Falsehood, edited by Brean Hammond (2010)
 Sir Thomas More, edited by John Jowett (2011)
 King Edward III, edited by Richard Proudfoot and Nicola Bennett (2017)

Revised editions
Due to the long period of time over which the series was published, several editions listed above were re-issued in revised editions, The first—Shakespeare's Sonnets—was published in 2010, fifteen years after the series began. Eight editions have been reissued in revised form. Others contained minor revisions in later printings, such as Henry V, but are not so noted on the title page.
 Shakespeare's Sonnets (2010)
 The Tempest (2011)
 The Two Noble Kinsmen (2015)
 Troilus and Cressida (2015)
 Much Ado About Nothing (2016)
 Othello (2016)
 Hamlet (2016)
 Titus Andronicus (2018)

Fourth Series

In March 2015, Bloomsbury Academic named Peter Holland of the University of Notre Dame, Zachary Lesser of the University of Pennsylvania, and Tiffany Stern of the University of Birmingham's Shakespeare Institute as general editors of The Arden Shakespeare fourth series.

Arden Early Modern Drama
In 2009, The Arden Shakespeare launched a companion series, entitled "Arden Early Modern Drama". The series follows the formatting and scholarly style of The Arden Shakespeare third series, but shifts the focus onto less well-known English Renaissance playwrights, primarily the Elizabethan, Jacobean, and Caroline periods (although the plays Everyman and Mankind hail from the reign of King Henry VII).

The general editors for this series are Suzanne Gossett of Loyola University Chicago; John Jowett of the Shakespeare Institute, University of Birmingham; and Gordon McMullan of King's College London.
 The Duchess of Malfi by John Webster, edited by Leah Marcus (2009)
 Everyman and Mankind, edited by Douglas Bruster and Eric Rasmussen (2009)
 Philaster by Francis Beaumont and John Fletcher, edited by Suzanne Gossett (2009)
 The Renegado by Philip Massinger, edited by Michael Neill (2010)
 'Tis Pity She's a Whore by John Ford, edited by Sonia Massai (2011)
 The Tragedy of Mariam by Elizabeth Cary, edited by Ramona Wray (2012)
 The Island Princess by John Fletcher, edited by Clare McManus (2013)
 The Spanish Tragedy by Thomas Kyd, edited by Clara Calvo and Jesús Tronch (2013)
 A Jovial Crew by Richard Brome, edited by Tiffany Stern (2014)
 The Witch of Edmonton by Thomas Dekker, John Ford and William Rowley, edited by Lucy Munro (2016).
 A Woman Killed with Kindness by Thomas Heywood, edited by Margaret Kidnie (2017).
 The Dutch Courtesan by John Marston, edited by Karen Britland (2018).
 The Revenger's Tragedy by Thomas Middleton, edited by Gretchen Minton (2018).
 The White Devil by John Webster, edited by Benedict S. Robinson (2018).
 The Jew of Malta by Christopher Marlowe, edited by William H. Sherman and Chloe Preedy (2021).
 Arden of Faversham, edited by Catherine Richardson (2022).

Complete Works
Arden Shakespeare has also published a Complete Works of Shakespeare, which reprints editions from the second and third series but without the explanatory notes.

Arden Performance Editions
In 2017, The Arden Shakespeare launched a new series of Performance Editions of Shakespeare's major plays, aimed specifically for use by actors and directors in the rehearsal room, and drama students in the classroom. Each edition features facing-page notes, short definitions of words, guidance on metre and punctuation, large font for easy reading, and plenty of blank space to write notes. The series editors are Professor Michael Dobson and Dr Abigail Rokison-Woodall and leading Shakespearean actor, Simon Russell Beale. The series is published in association with the Shakespeare Institute.

Critical literature
The Arden Shakespeare has also published a number of series of literary and historical criticism to accompany The Arden Shakespeare Third Series and Arden Early Modern Drama imprints.

Notes

References

External links 

Series of books
Shakespearean scholarship